Honoris Crux may refer to one of five South African military decorations; a set of four classes of Honoris Crux decorations, the Honoris Crux Diamond, Honoris Crux Gold, Honoris Crux Silver and Honoris Crux  of 1975, which together replaced the discontinued Honoris Crux of 1952.

 Honoris Crux (1952), in use from 1952 to 1975
 Honoris Crux (1975), in use from 1975 to 2003
 Honoris Crux Silver, in use from 1975 to 2003
 Honoris Crux Gold, in use from 1975 to 1992
 Honoris Crux Diamond, in use from 1975 to 2003 (though never awarded)

References